Banu (also Romanized as Banū) is a village in Ruydar Rural District, Ruydar District, Khamir County, Hormozgan Province, Iran. At the 2006 census, its population was 420, in 95 families.

References 

Populated places in Khamir County